Restaurant Brands International Inc. (RBI) is a Canadian-based multinational fast food holding company. It was formed in 2014 by the $12.5 billion merger between American fast food restaurant chain Burger King and Canadian coffee shop and restaurant chain Tim Hortons, and expanded by the 2017 purchase of American fast-food chain Popeyes Louisiana Kitchen. The company is the fifth-largest operator of fast food restaurants in the world behind Subway, McDonald's, Starbucks and Yum! Brands. RBI is based alongside Tim Hortons in Toronto (previously Oakville, Ontario). For tax purposes, Burger King and Popeyes retain their existing operations and headquarters, both in Miami. The 2014 merger focused primarily on expanding the international reach of the Tim Hortons brand and providing financial efficiencies for both companies.

3G Restaurant Brands Holdings LP, an affiliate of the Brazilian investment company 3G Capital, owns a 32% stake in Restaurant Brands International. The company is publicly traded on the New York Stock Exchange and the Toronto Stock Exchange.

In January 2019, Jose Cil was named the CEO of Restaurant Brands International, and Daniel Schwartz was named the executive chairman of the company.

History 
On August 24, 2014, American fast-food chain Burger King announced that it was in negotiations to merge with the Canadian coffee shop and restaurant chain Tim Hortons. The proposed merger would involve a tax inversion into Canada, with a new holding company majority-owned by Burger King's current majority-owner, 3G Capital, and the remaining shares in the company held by current Burger King and Tim Hortons shareholders. A Tim Hortons representative stated that the proposed merger would allow Tim Hortons to leverage Burger King's resources for international growth; the two chains would retain separate operations post-merger. News of the proposal caused Tim Hortons' shares to increase in value by 28 percent.

On August 25, 2014, Burger King officially confirmed its intent to acquire Tim Hortons Inc. in a deal totaling CDN$12.5 billion (US$11.4 billion). 3G Capital purchased the company at $65.50 per share, and existing shareholders received $65.50 in cash and 0.8025 shares in the new holding company: per-share—all-cash ($88.50) and all-shares (3.0879) options would also be available. Due to its iconic status in Canadian culture, CEO Marc Caira reassured the integrity of Tim Hortons following the purchase, stating that the acquisition would "enable us to move more quickly and efficiently to bring Tim Hortons' iconic Canadian brand to a new global customer base".

Although tax inversions, a process in which a company moves its headquarters to a country with a lower tax rate but maintains the majority of their operations in their previous location, had been a recent financial trend, it did not have as much of an impact on Burger King's reincorporation in Canada. The corporate tax rate in the United States was at the time 39.1% (since then lowered to 21%), while Canada's corporate tax rate is only 26%; however, Burger King had already used various sheltering techniques to reduce its tax rate to 27.5%. As a high-profile instance of tax inversion, news of the merger was criticized by U.S. politicians, who felt that the move would result in a loss of tax revenue to foreign interests, and could result in further government pressure against inversions (which had, until the Burger King merger, been primarily invoked by pharmaceutical firms). 3G Capital co-founder Alex Behring denied that the merger was tax-related, stating that it was "fundamentally about growth and creating value through accelerated expansion".

The deal was approved in Canada by the Competition Bureau on October 28, 2014, ruling that the deal was "unlikely to result in a substantial lessening or prevention of competition". The deal was approved by Minister of Industry James Moore on December 4, 2014; the two companies agreed to conditions, requiring that the Burger King and Tim Hortons chains retain separate operations, not combine locations in Canada and the United States, maintain "significant employment levels" at the Oakville headquarters, and ensure that Canadians make up at least 30% of Tim Hortons' board of directors. Tim Hortons shareholders approved the merger on December 9, 2014; the same day, it was announced that the new holding company would be known as Restaurant Brands International, and trade under the ticker symbol QSR. Vice-chairman Marc Caira felt that the merger was the "next chapter" for Tim Hortons, envisioning a "bolder, more assertive, and dynamic Tim Hortons in the future" alongside its prospects for international expansion.

Acquisitions
On February 21, 2017, RBI announced its intent to acquire Popeyes Louisiana Kitchen for US$1.8 billion at US$79 per share. On March 27, 2017, the deal closed with RBI purchasing Popeyes at $79 per share via Orange, Inc, an indirect subsidiary of RBI.

On November 15, 2021, RBI announced its intent to acquire Firehouse Subs for US$1 billion. The acquisition was completed on December 15, 2021.

Finances

Ownership and leadership 
3G Capital (which held a 71% majority stake in Burger King) holds a 32% stake in Restaurant Brands International. Berkshire Hathaway, which partially funded the merger, held a 4.8% stake in the mid to late 2010s. Previous Tim Hortons shareholders hold a sizeable share of the combined company.  Until early 2019, Daniel Schwartz served as CEO of the company, with previous Tim Hortons CEO Marc Caira being vice-chairman and director. In January 2019, Jose Cil was named the CEO of Restaurant Brands International, and Schwartz was named the executive chairman of the company.

In August 2020, it was revealed that Berkshire Hathaway had completely sold its stake in RBI.

See also
 List of Canadian restaurant chains 
 History of Burger King

References

External links

 

 
2014 establishments in Ontario
Holding companies established in 2014
Canadian companies established in 2014
Restaurants established in 2014
Companies listed on the Toronto Stock Exchange
Companies listed on the New York Stock Exchange
Multinational food companies
Holding companies of Canada
Restaurant groups in Canada
S&P/TSX 60
Tax inversions